De Marney is the surname of two brothers:

 Derrick De Marney (1906–1978), English actor and producer
 Terence De Marney (1908–1971), British actor, theatre director and writer

See also
 Marney, a surname
 Marnay (disambiguation), including people with the surname